The Madonna and Child Enthroned with Saints (Young Baptist and Saints Peter, Catherine, Lucy, and Paul), also known as the Colonna Altarpiece, is a painting by the Italian High Renaissance artist Raphael, executed c. 1503-1505. It is housed in the Metropolitan Museum of Art of New York City. It is the only altarpiece by Raphael in the United States.

The collection of Metropolitan Museum of Art also contains a painting of the Agony in the Garden from the predella of the altarpiece.  Other panels from the predella can be found in the collections of the National Gallery, London, the Isabella Stewart Gardner Museum, in Boston, and Dulwich Picture Gallery, in London.  A preparatory drawing by Raphael for the composition of the agony in the garden is in the collection of the Morgan Library New York.

The pieces of the predella were separated from the altarpiece and sold to Queen Christina of Sweden, from where they reached the Orleans Collection, while the main panels themselves were eventually sold to the aristocratic Colonna family in Rome, from whom the altarpiece takes its name.  The Altarpiece was the last Raphael altar in private hands when J.P. Morgan purchased it in the early 20th century for a record price.

See also
List of paintings by Raphael

Notes

References

Further reading
 Linda Wolk-Simon, Raphael at the Metropolitan: The Colonna Altarpiece, Exh. cat. Metropolitan Museum of Art, New York 2006.

External links
 

Paintings of the Madonna and Child by Raphael
Paintings in the collection of the Metropolitan Museum of Art
1505 paintings
Angels in art
Altarpieces
Books in art
Paintings formerly in the Orleans Collection